Qaleh Tarfi (also Romanized as  Qal‘eh Ţarfī and Qal‘eh-ye Ţarfī) is a village in Soveyseh Rural District, in the Soveyseh District of Karun County, Khuzestan Province, Iran. At the 2006 census, its population was 529, in 83 families.

References 

Populated places in Karun County